Minnesota Public Radio broadcasts on 43 stations that serve Minnesota and its neighboring communities and 42 translators providing additional local coverage.  (40 + 41 = 81 total.)  Stations are located in Minnesota, Wisconsin (La Crosse), North Dakota (Fargo and Grand Forks), South Dakota (Sioux Falls), Michigan (Houghton), Iowa (Decorah), and Idaho (Sun Valley). MPR also operates KPCC in Pasadena, California.

Most areas are served by both a classical music station and a news and information station. One location is covered by a single station that combines both services. Two locations are served by a classical music station, a news and information station, and The Current.

MPR's newest service, The Current, is available in Austin, Hinckley, Mankato, the Twin Cities, New Ulm, Rochester and St. Peter.

Minnesota Public Radio also broadcasts all three of its services — News, Classical and The Current — on HD Radio in several communities throughout the state of Minnesota. In the Twin Cities, MPR multicasts "Classical 24", BBC News and "More", a Spanish language service from Radio Netherlands called "Ahora", and "Wonderground Radio", a service specifically geared towards children.

Gray background indicates a network flagship.
Blue background indicates an FM translator.

References

External links 
Minnesota Public Radio Web site, including history and list of stations
Minnewiki: The Minnesota Music Encyclopedia – Wiki operated by Minnesota Public Radio

American Public Media Group

American Public Media
Radio in Minnesota
Non-profit organizations based in Minnesota
Radio stations in Minnesota
American radio networks

no:Minnesota Public Radio